The Shire of Bass was a local government area about  south-southeast of Melbourne, the state capital of Victoria, Australia.

Its administrative centre was located in Archies Creek.

History

Bass was first incorporated as the Phillip Island Road District on 8 September 1871, and became the Shire of Phillip Island and Woolamai on 24 December 1874. When the Phillip Island Riding was severed on 19 September 1928, its name changed to the Shire of Woolamai, and finally the Shire of Bass on 8 January 1929. It was reduced and redefined in 1977, including the loss of North Wonthaggi to the Borough of Wonthaggi.

The shire's area covered the majority of the mainland of the currently existing Bass Coast Shire, except for the areas of Wonthaggi, Inverloch, parts of the areas south of Korumburra and some of the coastline southwest of The Gurdies.

On 2 December 1994, the Shire of Bass was abolished, and along with the Borough of Wonthaggi, the Shire of Phillip Island and parts of the City of Cranbourne and the Shires of Korumburra and Woorayl, was merged into the newly created Bass Coast Shire.

Wards

The Shire of Bass was divided into three ridings, each of which elected three councillors:
 Bass Valley Riding
 Powlett Riding
 Woolamai Riding

Towns and localities
 Almurta
 Anderson
 Archies Creek*
 Bass
 Corinella
 Coronet Bay
 Dalyston
 Glen Alvie
 Glen Forbes
 Grantville
 Kernot
 Kilcunda
 San Remo
 Woolamai

* Council seat.

Population

* Estimate in the 1958 Victorian Year Book.

References

External links
 Victorian Places - Bass Shire

Bass